Robert McQuillin FGS FRSE is a scientist and author.

As an author, he has been collected by libraries. He is from Brampton, Cumberland.

Societies
1986 Elected Fellow or the Royal Society of Edinburgh
Fellow of the Geological Society of London (past Vice-President); awarded the Lyell Fund in 1970
Fellow of the Geological Society of Edinburgh (past Vice-President)

Published scientific articles
An Introduction To Seismic Interpretation
Explaining the North Sea's lunar floor 
Footwall uplift in the Inner Moray Firth basin, offshore Scotland

References

Scottish geologists
1935 births
People from Brampton, Carlisle
Scottish scientists
20th-century Scottish writers
Living people